Boulder Canyon, originally Devils Gate Canyon, is a canyon on the Colorado River, above Hoover Dam, now flooded by Lake Mead. It lies between Clark County, Nevada and Mohave County, Arizona.
Boulder Canyon divides the Black Mountains into the Black Mountains of Arizona, and the Black Mountains of Nevada. Its mouth is now under the eastern end of the Boulder Basin of Lake Mead, between Canyon Point in Nevada and Canyon Ridge in Arizona. Its original mouth is now underneath Lake Mead between Beacon Rock and Fortification Ridge on the southern shore in Arizona.

History
From 1879 to 1887, the Southwestern Mining Company was mining large quantities of salt in the mountains along the Virgin River, and it had leased steamboats of the Colorado Steam Navigation Company to ship it to the mill at Eldorado Canyon. In April 1883, Captain John Alexander Mellon took a small boat up river to Devil's Gate Canyon to plant six ring bolts eight inches in diameter, four feet long, made of 1.75 inches (diameter) of iron. These ring bolts were for  securing lines from the steamboats as they passed over the dangerous rapids of Devil's Gate Canyon, during their high water runs to the mouth of the Virgin River at Rioville, Nevada.

References

Canyons and gorges of Nevada
Canyons and gorges of Arizona
Colorado River
Landforms of Clark County, Nevada
Landforms of Mohave County, Arizona